Hōlei Sea Arch is a 90-foot (27-meter)-high natural arch located in Hawaii, on the southern coast of the Big Island, south of Kīlauea. This rock formation was born from marine erosion, in which the waves of the Pacific Ocean create this natural bridge of lava cliffs. The arch is made of basalt. It takes its name from the Hōlei Pali, the escarpment located up on the slopes of the volcano.

Located in the Ka'ū District of Hawaii County and in the Hawaii Volcanoes National Park, it is at the end of the Chain of Craters Road, cut short by the lava flows emitted by Puu Oo Crater since 1990. It thus constitutes a tourist attraction of the national park.

Transportation
It is accessible by car via the Chain of Craters Road from Halemaʻumaʻu, the main Kīlauea caldera.

References

Natural arches of the United States
Hawaiʻi Volcanoes National Park
Tourism in Hawaii
Kīlauea